Sadhu Singh was an Indian racewalker. He competed in the men's 10 kilometres walk at the 1948 Summer Olympics.

References

External links
 

Year of birth missing
Possibly living people
Athletes (track and field) at the 1948 Summer Olympics
Indian male racewalkers
Olympic athletes of India
Place of birth missing